Fantasia is an American R&B singer.

Awards and nominations

Notes

References

External links 

 
 

Fantasia Barrino
Awards